The following is a list of zombie short films and other zombie- and undead-related projects, such as television series.

Zombies are creatures usually portrayed as either reanimated corpses or mindless human beings, in both cases cannibalistic or more widely as undead bodies, ghouls, mummies, reanimated corpses, vampires and so on. While zombie films generally fall into the horror genre, some cross over into other genres, such as comedy, science fiction, thriller, or romance. Distinct subgenres have evolved, such as the "zombie comedy" or the "zombie apocalypse". Zombies in this article are not distinct from other types of undead like ghouls, ghosts, mummies, or vampires.

Short films and Anthology Segments

{|class="wikitable sortable"
|-
! Title !! Director !! Year !! Notes !! References
|-
| 2 Hours || Michael Ballif || 2012 || || 
|-
|28 Weeks Later: Jealous Rage
|Phil Stoole, Damien Sung
|2007
|
|
|-
| The ABCs of Death, segment "W is for WTF?" || Jon Schnepp 
|2012|| || 
|-
| Aces & Eights || Matt Allen|| 2008 || rowspan="3" | zombie || 
|-
| Afternoon of the Rat-Faced Zombies (aka 28 Beers Later) || Vinson Pike|| 2012 || 
|-
| Alice Jacobs Is Dead || Alex Horwitz|| 2009 || 
|-
| All of the Dead || Tony Mines & Tim Drage|| 2000 || Lego-zombie || 
|-
|Ash vs. Lovo and the DC Dead
|Brian K. Rosenthal
|2016
|continuation of Marvel Zombies vs. Army of Darkness
|
|-
| Best Friends || Ruwan Heggelman|| 2016 || Short zombie comedy || 
|-
| Boot Hill Blind Dead || Chris Mackey & Alana Smithe|| 2003 || rowspan="3" | zombie || 
|-
| Bubba's Chili Parlor || Joey Evans|| 2005 || 
|-
| The Dead Have Risen || Mitch Csanadi|| 2006 || 
|-
| Dead Things, segment "The Wish" || D.T. Carney || 2005 || short story in anthology film || 
|-
| Dinner Party of the Damned || Brian Wimer|| 2008 || zombie || 
|-
| Dong of the Dead || Joanna Angel || 2009 || Pornographic spoof of zombie-based films || 
|-
| Gay By Dawn || Jonathan London || 2004 || zombie ||  
|-
| Goregoyles: First Cut, segment "Berserkers" || Kevin J. Lindenmuth || 2003 || second short film in direct-to-video Goregoyles volume 1 series || 
|-
| Heavy Metal, segment "B-17" || Gerald Potterton || 1981 || short story within anthology feature film ||
|-
| Hood of Horror (Gang of Horror, Snoop Dogg's Hood of Horror) || Stacy Title || 2006 || third short story within anthology feature film || 
|-
| I Love Sarah Jane || Spencer Susser || 2008 || short film  ||
|-
| Fist of Jesus || David Muñoz, Adrián Cardona || 2012 || Spanish short film  ||
|-
| The Living Dead Chronicles || Webby|| 2008 
| || <ref>{{cite web |author=Webby |date=1 March 2008 |title=The Living Dead Chronicless Videos |type=Official Page |publisher=MySpace |url=https://www.myspace.com/livingdeadchronicles/videos |access-date=5 November 2012}}</ref>
|-
| I'll See You in My Dreams || Miguel Ángel Vivas || 2003 || short film  || 
|-
|Linnea Quigley's Horror Workout
|Kenneth J. Hall
|1990
|
|
|-
| Living Dead Girl || Jon Springer || 2003 
|zombie||  (Mpls/St.Paul=Minneapolis–Saint Paul)
|-
| Living Dead Lock Up 3: Siege of the Dead || Mario Xavier || 2008 || continuation of Living Dead Lock Up 2 || 
|-
| The Lost Tape: Andy's Terrifying Last Days Revealed || Zack Snyder || 2004 ||  Mockumentary short and addition to Dawn of the Dead (2004) ||  (Extra Feature: The Lost Tape: Andy's Terrifying Last Days Revealed.)
|-
| M is for Macho || José Pedro Lopes|| 2013 || rowspan="3" | zombie || 
|-
|Marvel Zombies vs. Army of Darkness
|Brian K. Rosenthal
|2013
|
|-
| Maybe.... || Christopher Kahler|| 2008 || 
|-
| Misery Bear - Dawn of the Ted || -- || 2010 || Teddy bear animation zombie short film || 
|-
| Mulva: Zombie Ass Kicker! || Chris Seaver || 2001 ||  ||  
|-
| Night of the Living Bread || Kevin S. O'Brien|| 1990 || rowspan="4" | Comedic parody of Night of the Living Dead (1968) || 
|-
| Night of the Living Carrots || Robert Porter|| 2011 || 
|-
| Night of the Living Jews || Oliver Noble || 2008 || 
|-
| Night of the Not So Living Dead Guy || Michael Kesler|| 2002 || 
|-
| The Night Shift || Thomas Smith|| 2009 || "Trigger" is a name of a female demon-zombie. Featured movie based on this short is The Night Shift (2011). || 
|-
| Night Shift || Rob Chinery, Scott Chinery & Tommy Chinery|| 2010 || zombie || 
|-
| Nightmare Alley, segment "A Fistful of Innards" || Laurence Holloway & Scarlet Fry|| 2010 || first short story in anthology film || 
|-
| Paris by Night of the Living Dead || Grégory Morin|| 2009 ||zombie || 
|-
| Re-Penetrator || Doug Sakmann|| 2004 || A pornographic spoof of Re-Animator. In 2006, the film was edited and added to the anthology LovecraCked! The Movie. || 
|-
| Rising Up: The Story of the Zombie Rights Movement || Laura Moss || 2009 ||BIFF 2009 Award Winner — Laura Moss (Indie Soul Best Director Award) || 
|-
| Scary or Die, segments "The Crossing", "Clowned" || Michael Emanuel|| 2012 || anthology film with segment on zombies, infected clowns || 
|-
| School of the Dead || Sam Horsley|| 2010 || rowspan="2" | zombie || 
|-
| School of the Dead (a.k.a. Liam Hooper's School of the Dead) || Liam Hooper|| 2012 || 
|-
| Slices of Life, segment "W.O.R.M."  || Anthony G. Sumner || 2010 || first segment of anthology film, software hack turns people into "corporate zombies", although they do not really die first || 
|-
| Song of the Dead || Chip Gubera || 2004 || Featured movie based on this short is Song of the Dead (2005). || 
|-
|Special Report: Zombie Invasion
|Scott Devine, Constantine Nasr
|2004
|short
|
|-
| Still || Carl Timms || 2016 || A living statue entertainer is caught up in the middle of a zombie outbreak.Surrounded on all sides with only his ability to stay very still to save him, he must work out a way to survive.|| 
|-
| Stitched || Garth Ennis || 2011 || Necromanced "war zombies" || 
|-
| Street of the Dead || Joe Pontillo|| 2008 || rowspan="2" | zombie || 
|-
| They Shall Pay with Rivers of Blood || Buck Anderson|| 2009 || 
|-
| Undead Ted || Daniel Knight || 2007 || 7-minute short film ||  
|-
| V/H/S, segment "Tape 56" || Adam Wingard || 2012 || rowspan="2" | short story within anthology feature film ||
|-
| V/H/S/2, segment "A Ride in the Park"  || Eduardo Sánchez and Gregg Hale || 2013 || 
|-
| The Walken Dead || Ryan Hunter|| 2011 || Parody spoofs The Walking Dead TV series combining its theme with actor Christopher Walken movie quotes || 
|-
| Worst Case Scenario (Woensdag Gehaktdag) || Richard Raaphorst|| 2004 || DVD released in 2008 ||  (About promo release on DVD in 2008.)
|-
| The Zombeatles: All You Need Is Brains || Doug Gordon|| 2009 || Timeline: autumn 2008 – shot; 23 January 2009 – premiere; 1 April 2009 – DVD on demand. ||  p. 36.
|-
|Zombie Movie
|Michael J. Asquith, Ben Stenbeck
|2005
|zombie
|
|-
| Zombie Hunter|| Geoff Hamby|| 2005 || zombie || 
|-
| Zombie in a Penguin Suit|| Chris Russell|| 2011 || follows the path of an aquarium worker-turned zombie || 
|-
| Zombie Run|| Damian Morter|| 2013 || || 
|-
| Zombie Valley || Darin Beckstead || 2003 || rowspan="3" | zombie || 
|-
| Zombie Vegetarians || Mad Martian || 2004 || 
|-
| Zombie Warrior || Daniel Flügger|| 2007 || 
|-
| Zombieworld || (multiple)|| 2014 || anthology of shorts || 
|-
| Zomblies || David M. Reynolds|| 2010 || zombie || 
|}

TV Series

Miscellaneous

This list considers "quasi-zombie" films and films where zombies exist in the title only. The films in this category satisfy the following requirements:
zombies or zombie-like undead do not exist in the storyline but are mentioned in the title;
the film has been released (otherwise the titles may be found at List of zombie short films and undead-related projects#Abandoned, in progress, and rumored projects).

Abandoned, in progress, and rumored projects

This list considers an announced' zombie-ish films. The films in this category satisfy the following requirement:
announced as zombie or zombie-ish undead film.

See also
List of apocalyptic and post-apocalyptic fiction
List of zombie video games
List of zombie films
List of zombie novels
Zombie (fictional)
List of vampire films

References

Bibliography

External links
IMDB – Keyword Zombie

 
z